Annaji Datto Sachiv was the Sachiv (Chief Secretary) in the Ashta Pradhan (Council of 8) mandal of the Maratha Empire during the rule of  Shivaji.

Early life
Before joining the services of Shivaji, Annaji Datto was a Kulkarni of Sangameshwar. He joined Shivaji's administration in 1647.

Career

Campaign on Panhala and Pawangad
Annaji Datto was assigned the job of capturing the Panhala fort after the Afzal episode. In 1659, Annaji  captured the Panhala fort and Pawangad fort from the Mughals.

Minister under Shivaji

Land reform
In 1667, Shivaji appointed Annaji to the task of land revenue reform in areas under the Swarajya.He improved upon Malik Amber's revenue system and introduced a new one. Annaji's efforts led to a new system of lower government claim on farm produce of 2/5.His work involved accurate land measurement, bringing new land under cultivation, and measures to reduce exploitation of the illiterate cultivators by the hereditary village officials such as the Patil and Kulkarni.
Annaji Datto also  carried out a survey known as Annaji Datto's Dhara. He improved upon Malik Amber's revenue system and introduced a new one, which is considered to be one of the great land-marks in the deve- lopment of agriculture in Maharashtra in medieval time

Sarkarkun for Konkan division
According to Subhasad Bhakhar, the Maratha Empire of Shivaji was divided into three parts, each under a cabinet minister, called a Sarkarkun. Annaji Datto Sachiv, Moropant Trimbak Pingle, and Dattoji Pant were appointed sarkarkun. As sarkarkun, Annaji Datto controlled the Konkan territory, including Choul. Dabhol, Rajapur, Kudal, Bande, Phonda, and Koppal. This division between territories was called Talghat or Southern division.

Conflict with Sambhaji 
Shivaji's eldest son and presumptive heir, Sambhaji, was sent to the fort of Panhala by his father, who disapproved of his habits.  However, in December 1678 Sambhaji left the fort and defected to the Mughals for a year, but then returned home when he learnt of a plan by Dilir Khan, the Mughal viceroy of Deccan to arrest him and send him to Delhi. Upon returning home, Sambhaji was unrepentant and was again put under surveillance at Panhala by his father. However, Shivaji soon fell ill and died in April 1680.  The news of Shivaji's death reached Sambhaji at Panhala within eleven days.

Conspiracy with Soyarabai
At the  time of Shivaji's death, Annaji conspired with Shivaji's widow, Soyarabai to lure  the Council of ministers (ashtapradhan mandal), into electing her then ten year old younger son Rajaram to the throne of Maratha swarajya with Soyarabai as the regent. On 21 April 1680, arrangements were made to make Rajaram's position secure. The coronation of Rajaram I was performed by Annaji Datto and a few of Rajaram's supporters.

Soyarabai and Minister's proposed Sambhaji for the division of the Maratha Empire. When their proposal of the division of the Swarajya was turned down by Sambhaji, the adherents of the cause of Rajaram, Peshwa Moropant Pingle, Annaji Datto and others marched against Sambhaji. However, Sambhaji quickly won over the support of the Maratha army. He arrested those who had marched against him on the way to Panhala between 19 May and 2 June 1680. Sambhaji marched on Raigad and gained possession of the capital on 18 June 1680. He promptly put Rajaram, Soyarabai in close confinement.

Execution
Annaji and other ministers involved in the conspiracy were arrested and either executed or confined. Annaji was however released after a period. Later in 1681 when Prince Akbar, Aurangzeb's rebel son was given asylum by Sambhaji, Annaji and several members of the Shirke clan (of Yesubai) promised the Deccan to Akbar in exchange for leaving a small kingdom for Rajaram. Akbar refused to be a party to this conspiracy and betrayed these conspirators to Sambhaji who quickly executed Annaji, his brother Somaji, a large number of the Asthapradhan members and members of the Shirke family in August 1681.

References

Bibliography

People of the Maratha Empire